Die Anarchisten: Kulturgemälde aus dem Ende des XIX Jahrhunderts (The Anarchists: A Picture of Civilization at the Close of the Nineteenth Century) is a book by anarchist writer John Henry Mackay published in German and English in 1891. It is the best known and most widely read of Mackay's works, and made him famous overnight. Mackay made it clear in the book's subtitle that it was not intended as a novel, and complained when it was criticised as such, declaring it instead propaganda. A Yiddish translation by Abraham Frumkin was published in London in 1908 by the Worker's Friend Group, with an introduction by the journal's editor, prominent London anarchist Rudolf Rocker. It was also translated into Czech, Dutch, French, Italian, Russian, Spanish, and Swedish. Die Anarchisten had sold 6,500 copies in Germany by 1903, 8,000 by 1911, and over 15,000 by the time of the author's death in 1933.

Content 
Die Anarchisten is a semi-fictional account of Mackay's year in London from the spring of 1887 to that of the following year, written from the perspective of protagonist and author surrogate Carrard Auban. It chronicles Mackay's conversion to the individualist philosophy of Max Stirner, to whom the book is dedicated. In it, Mackay unfavourably counterposes the then-prevalent communist anarchism with individualist anarchism, to which he had been won over by Benjamin R. Tucker, and which Auban represents in the face of his communist counterpart Otto Trupp (whose position is akin to that of Gustav Landauer). Much of the book focuses on arguments between the anarchist advocates of violence, epitomised by Trupp, and those such as Auban who believe that propaganda of the deed inadvertently strengthens the authorities it seeks to undermine. Mackay scholar Thomas Riley comments:

Influence and reception 
Die Anarchisten proved to be influential. According to a remark by Rocker in 1927, the book's publication in Zürich in 1891 caused considerable excitement in anarchist circles, which had hitherto been unfamiliar with any form of anarchism other than the communist anarchism they uniformly subscribed to. It firmly established Stirner's philosophy in the German anarchist movement. The book influenced Romantic composer Richard Strauss, who read it avidly and was reportedly engaged in a heated discussion concerning it hours before the opening of his first opera, Guntram.

A Companion to Twentieth-century German Literature describes the work as "a skilful portrayal of cultural life in Germany at the end of the nineteenth century". Anarchist historian Paul Avrich found the book to be "remarkable", while his counterpart George Woodcock commented that it revealed Mackay to be "a sort of inferior libertarian Gissing". In his memoirs, Austrian philosopher Rudolf Steiner wrote of the book:

See also 

Anarchist schools of thought
The Secret Agent, a 1907 novel by Joseph Conrad set in the London anarchist scene
 List of books about anarchism

Footnotes

Bibliography

Further reading

External links 
Die Anarchisten at the Anarchy Archives, original George Schumm translation

 

1891 novels
Anarcho-communism
Anarchist fiction
Books about anarchism
Individualist anarchism